Orn or ORN may refer to:

Orn (name), a given name and surname
 Orn, the second book in Piers Anthony's trilogy Of Man and Manta 
 Offshoring Research Network, an international network researching the offshoring of business processes and services
 Olfactory receptor neuron, a type of cell in the nasal mucosa that transduces the presence of odorant molecules into a neural signal
 Olympic route network, a network of dedicated roads linking venues and other key sites in the host city during Olympic games
 Oran Es Sénia Airport (IATA code), an international airport in Es Sénia, Algeria
 Ornithine, an amino acid that plays a role in the urea cycle
 Osteoradionecrosis, a complication of radiation therapy where a section of bone dies

See also

 
 
 Orm (disambiguation)